Buckner is a village in Franklin County, Illinois, United States. The population was 409 at the 2020 census. The current mayor is Aaron Eubanks.

History
The village was named after American Civil War Union veteran Moses Buckner (b. Feb 11, 1827 d. April 17, 1882), who served in the 15th Regiment Illinois Volunteer Cavalry.

United Coal Mine No. 2 opened in 1911 in Buckner under the ownership of the United Coal Mining Company (later the United Coal Corporation). The mine was sold to the Old Ben Coal Corporation in 1960, and renamed Old Ben Coal Mine No. 14. Eight men were killed in an explosion in 1915, and one man was killed in a gas explosion in 1931. The mine was idle in 1933. Its last production was 1960.

This village had a number of taverns and nightclubs and was known as one of the biggest entertainment areas of Franklin County from the 1950s to the early 1980s.

Geography
Buckner is located in west-central Franklin County at  (37.981131, -89.015693). Illinois Route 14 passes through the village, leading east  to Benton, the county seat, and west  to Christopher.

Demographics

As of the census of 2000, there were 479 people, 218 households, and 134 families residing in the village. The racial makeup of the village was 98.33% White, 0.84% Native American, and 0.84% from two or more races. Hispanic or Latino of any race were 1.25% of the population.

There were 218 households, out of which 22.9% had children under the age of 18 living with them, 44.5% were married couples living together, 10.6% had a female householder with no husband present, and 38.5% were non-families. 33.0% of all households were made up of individuals, and 14.7% had someone living alone who was 65 years of age or older.  The average household size was 2.20 and the average family size was 2.78.

In the village, the population was spread out, with 21.3% under the age of 18, 7.7% from 18 to 24, 28.0% from 25 to 44, 23.6% from 45 to 64, and 19.4% who were 65 years of age or older.  The median age was 41 years. For every 100 females, there were 96.3 males.  For every 100 females age 18 and over, there were 97.4 males.

The median income for a household in the village was $25,119, and the median income for a family was $29,167. Males had a median income of $24,875 versus $16,750 for females. The per capita income for the village was $12,260.  About 18.9% of families and 23.3% of the population were below the poverty line, including 29.0% of those under age 18 and 3.0% of those age 65 or over.

References

Villages in Franklin County, Illinois
Villages in Illinois
Populated places in Southern Illinois